Newspapers published or distributed in the Gascoyne region of Western Australia have been spread over a large distance, and in varying degrees of success. The region has a low population density, and some communities, apart from Carnarvon, would not be sufficient to support long term newspaper production.

In most cases, newspaper located in Perth and Geraldton would have summary news about the Gascoyne to supplement any local publications news. Pilbara newspapers have overlapped the Gascoyne region, but in most cases they are separate.

Titles

See also
 List of newspapers in Western Australia
 Goldfields-Esperance newspapers
 Great Southern newspapers
 Kimberley newspapers
 Mid West newspapers
 South West newspapers
 Wheatbelt newspapers

References

External links 
 

Lists of newspapers published in Western Australia
Gascoyne newspapers
Gascoyne